Marjorie Constance Caserio (née Beckett; February 26, 1929 – April 19, 2021) was an English chemist. In 1975, she was awarded the Garvan Medal by the American Chemical Society.

Early life and education
Caserio was born Marjorie Constance Beckett in Cricklewood, London, England.  She attended the North London Collegiate School and began studying podiatry at Chelsea College, but soon developed a preference for chemistry and graduated with honors in the subject in 1950.  She was awarded a Sir John Dill Fellowship by the English-Speaking Union which allowed her to study at Bryn Mawr College in the United States, she earned an M.A. in chemistry in 1951. Her thesis was entitled "The alkaline hydrolysis of ethyl p-alkybenzoates."

For a year she worked at the Fulmer Research Institute in rural Stoke Poges, England, researching the effects of fluorides on titanium, but disliked the work and decided to seek a Ph.D. in chemistry.  She interviewed with Nobel laureate Derek Barton and was accepted to Birkbeck College in London, but was not offered financial aid. Instead, Caserio returned to Bryn Mawr in the U.S., earning her Ph.D. in 1956 with a dissertation entitled "The kinetics of bromination of naphthalene."

Career 
Caserio was hired by John D. Roberts for a postdoctoral position at the California Institute of Technology. She spent eight years at Caltech, working on 3- and 4-membered ring compounds, the reactions of alcohols with diazomethane, the hydrolysis of diaryliodonium salts, the deamination of nitrous acid, and benzyne reaction intermediates in nucleophilic aromatic substitution reactions.

She collaborated with Roberts in writing an organic chemistry textbook, Basic Principles of Organic Chemistry, first published in 1964. Notable for its comprehensiveness and then-unusual emphasis on spectroscopy, it proved enormously influential in how the subject was taught. Also working with Roberts was chemist Fred Caserio.

University of California, Irvine 
In 1964, Caserio was hired as the second faculty member in chemistry at the brand new University of California, Irvine. At UC Irvine she worked on addition reactions in allenes and bonding and reactions of sulfur compounds. She was one of the first scientists to employ nuclear magnetic resonance spectroscopy to study the kinetics and mechanisms of these organic reactions, and ion cyclotron resonance to study gas-phase reactions. Caserio became a full professor at UC Irvine in 1972, and chair of the chemistry department in 1987.

University of California, San Diego 
In 1990, she became Vice Chancellor for Academic Affairs at the University of California, San Diego. She later served as interim Chancellor, and retired in 1996.

Personal life 
In 1957, she married Fred Caserio; she became a US citizen the same year.

References

Books

External links
 UC San Diego page
 A video interview of Caserio
 Marjorie Constance Caserio's obituary

1929 births
2021 deaths
Bryn Mawr College alumni
California Institute of Technology faculty
University of California, Irvine faculty
University of California, San Diego administrators
Recipients of the Garvan–Olin Medal
American women chemists
21st-century American chemists
American women academics
English emigrants to the United States
People from Cricklewood
21st-century American women scientists